The following is a list of directors of the Puerto Rico Office of Management and Budget.

References

Cabinet-level officers of the Cabinet of Puerto Rico
 
Secretariat of Governance of Puerto Rico